Nick Taylor (born March 27, 1988) is a professional Canadian football defensive back for the Winnipeg Blue Bombers of the Canadian Football League (CFL).

College career
Taylor did not play college football, but rather played college basketball for the FIU Panthers at the point guard position.

Professional career
Taylor was originally signed as a free agent in 2012 by the Minnesota Vikings of the National Football League (NFL), but he suffered a shoulder injury and was released. He later played for the Orlando Predators in 2015. He spent two seasons with the Ottawa Redblacks, including his first Grey Cup championship win in 2016. He signed with the Edmonton Eskimos in 2018 and was released in 2019 before signing with the Winnipeg Blue Bombers on August 19, 2019. He won his second Grey Cup championship in 2019.

Taylor signed a one-year contract extension with the Winnipeg Blue Bombers on January 7, 2021. He played in 12 regular season games and both post-season games as he won his third Grey Cup following the Blue Bombers' 108th Grey Cup victory.

References

External links
Winnipeg Blue Bombers bio
FIU basketball bio

1988 births
Living people
American football defensive backs
Canadian football defensive backs
Sportspeople from Hollywood, Florida
FIU Panthers men's basketball players
Minnesota Vikings players
Orlando Predators players
Ottawa Redblacks players
Edmonton Elks players
Winnipeg Blue Bombers players